Marmaduke Arundel "Duke" Wetherell (1883 – 25 February 1939) was a British–South African actor, screenwriter, producer, film director and big-game hunter. He was responsible for the hoax "surgeon's photograph" of the Loch Ness Monster.

Biography
Born in Bodmin, Cornwall, Wetherell acted in both British and South African films during the silent era. In the 1920s he branched out to producing and directing films but they were not a success. He produced, directed and played the lead role in his productions of  Livingstone (1925) and Robinson Crusoe (1927). A planned biography of Lawrence of Arabia called Revolt in the Desert to be photographed by Freddie Young who had photographed his war films The Somme (1927) and Victory (1928) did not eventuate. Wetherell was the father of actor Ian Colin.

In the 1930s, Marmaduke went to Loch Ness to look for the Loch Ness Monster. Wetherell claimed to have found footprints, but when casts of the footprints were sent to scientists for analysis they turned out to be from a hippopotamus; a prankster had used a hippopotamus-foot umbrella stand. As a result, Wetherell was publicly ridiculed by his employer, the Daily Mail. To get revenge on the Mail, Wetherell perpetrated the hoax "surgeon's photograph" of the Loch Ness Monster with his son Ian (who bought the material for the fake and took the photos), son-in-law Christian Spurling (a sculpture specialist), and Maurice Chambers (an insurance agent), taking a picture of a toy submarine made of plastic wood and passing it off as the monster. Chambers gave the photographic plates to surgeon Robert Kenneth Wilson, a friend of his who enjoyed "a good practical joke". Wilson had the plates developed and sold the first photo to the Daily Mail; the Mail would then announce that the monster had been photographed. The photo had been described as a hoax as early as 1975, but this was not common knowledge among the general public until 1994.

Selected filmography
Actor

 The Rose of Rhodesia (1918)
 Isban: Or the Mystery of the Great Zimbabwe (1920)
 The Madcap of the Veld (1921)
 Wee MacGregor's Sweetheart (1922)
 Man and His Kingdom (1922)
 His Wife's Husband (1922)
 Darkness (1923)
 Curfew Must Not Ring Tonight (1923)
 Women and Diamonds (1924)

Director

 Livingstone (1925)
 Robinson Crusoe (1927)
 The Somme (1927)
 Victory (1928)
 A Moorland Tragedy (1933)
 Hearts of Oak (1933)
 Wanderlust (1933)
 Safari (1937)

Producer
 Roses of Picardy (1927)

Bibliography
 Low, Rachael. History of the British Film, 1918–1929. George Allen & Unwin, 1971.

References

External links

Marmaduke Wetherell on Encyclopaedia of South African Theatre, Film, Media and Performance (ESAT) https://esat.sun.ac.za/index.php/M.A._Wetherell

1883 births
1939 deaths
British male film actors
British film producers
British film directors
South African male film actors
South African film producers
South African film directors
20th-century British male actors
Male actors from Cornwall